Below is a list of squads used in the 2004 African Cup of Nations.

Group A

Head coach:  Mick Wadsworth

Head coach:  Michel Dussuyer

Head coach:  Ratomir Dujković

Head coach:  Roger Lemerre

Group B

Head coach:  Jean-Paul Rabier

Head coach: Jacob Mulee

Since participation in CAN 2004, the Kenyan goalkeepers received traditional numbers 1, 13 and 22.

Head coach:  Henri Stambouli

Head coach:  Guy Stéphan

Group C

Head coach: Rabah Saadane

Coach:  Winfried Schafer

Head coach: Mohsen Saleh

Coach: Sunday Marimo

Group D

Coach:  Cecil Jones Attuquayefio

Coach: Badou Zaki

Head coach: Christian Chukwu

Head coach: April Phumo

References
 RSSSF
 Cafonline (Archived 2009-05-14)
 Group A (Archived 2009-05-14)
 Group B
 Group D

Africa Cup of Nations squads